The National Concord (abbrev: MN) was a Malaysian political coalition that was formed between the Malaysian Islamic Party (PAS) and United Malays National Organisation (UMNO) against the then-ruling Pakatan Harapan (PH) coalition which had came into power after the 2018 Malaysian general election (GE14). The political cooperation between the two largest Malay/Muslim-based parties was officialised with the signing of the Piagam Muafakat Nasional (National Cooperation Charter). The five-point charter was signed by PAS president Abdul Hadi Awang and UMNO president Ahmad Zahid Hamidi in the Himpunan Penyatuan Ummah (Ummah Unity Rally) held at Putra World Trade Centre (PWTC), Kuala Lumpur on 14 September 2019. Its main aim is to unite the Malay/Muslim community or Ummah for electoral purposes.

Despite calls for Muafakat Nasional to be institutionalised and become more inclusive towards Barisan Nasional (BN) and Gagasan Sejahtera (GS) where UMNO and PAS are major component parties respectively, there has been no formal agreement with the other parties in both coalitions to migrate to Muafakat Nasional. The new Muafakat Nasional coalition had planned to be formalised at its inaugural convention to be held by May 2020. A permanent secretariat of the pact was set-up at UMNO's headquarters located at PWTC in May 2020.

Muafakat Nasional had extended an invitation to the Malaysian United Indigenous Party (BERSATU) led by its President and then-Prime Minister Muhyiddin Yassin to join the alliance in July 2020. On 15 August 2020, Muhyiddin reaffirmed that the party will join the alliance. However, BERSATU had also formed another coalition called Perikatan Nasional (PN) in the same period. On 3 April 2021, Wan Saiful Wan Jan the Information Chief of BERSATU revealed that the party had agreed to join the alliance but received no official response from either UMNO or PAS.

On 30 January 2022, ahead of the 2022 Johor state election, former prime minister Mohd Najib Abdul Razak disclosed that BERSATU was not included in the MN alliance as it had decided to contest against UMNO during the 2020 Sabah state election, in which BERSATU's newly formed PN coalition fielded candidates in all 17 seats.

On 15 December 2022, former Minister of Communication and Multimedia Tan Sri Annuar Musa declared that Muafakat Nasional was no longer a political coalition but a non-governmental organisation.   He is also announced the list of the council members of the Muafakat Nasional (MN), including former Selangor UMNO Chairman Noh Omar, former Minister of Home Affairs Zuraida Kamaruddin, Federal Territory President of the Homeland Fighters' Party Khairuddin Abu Hassan, Chinese Muslim scholar Mohd Ridhuan Tee Abdullah, Chairman of the Joint Committee of MCA Kelantan Chua Hock Kuan, and former Minister in the Prime Minister's Department Mohd Redzuan Md Yusof.

Leadership structure
 Chairman:
 Annuar Musa

 Deputy Chairman:
 Zuraida Kamaruddin
 Mohd Redzuan Md Yusof
 Edmund Santhara Kumar Ramanaidu
 Mohd Reduan Tee Abdullah

 Secretary General:
 Shahrul Nizam Yunos

 Executive Secretary:
 Mohd Irwan Rizal Ali Napiah

 Deputy Executive Secretary:
 Musa Sabri Abd Sattar
 Fariz Hadi

 Committee Members:
 Tengku Idris Sultan Abu Bakar
 Noh Omar
 Yahya Ibrahim
 Shamrahayu Abd Aziz
 Wan Azman Wan Abdullah
 Khairuddin Abu Hassan
 Sofian Ibrahim
 Aziz Ibrahim
 Zaini Mohamad
 Farah Umirah Paruwis
 Izzat Johari
 Lila Ruzaini Hussain
 Mohd Zuhdi Marzuki
 Siti Faezah Abd Rahman
 Ali Nor Ahlam
 Eizlan Yusof
 Jasper Supah
 Junaidy Abd Wahab
 Budiman Zohdi
 Zurihan Yusof
 Tun Faisal Ismail Aziz
 Mohamad Azam Ismail
 Chua Hock Kuan
 Subash Chandarabose

 State Chairman:
 Kedah: Mansor Mahamood
 Kelantan: Wan Azman Wan Sulaiman
 Pahang: Nasrudin Hasan Tantawi
 Selangor: Zuraida Kamaruddin
 Negeri Sembilan: Badrul Hisham Shaharin
 Sabah: Jasmit Japong
 Sarawak: Justine Jinggot

References

External links 
 

Political party alliances in Malaysia
Political parties established in 2019
2019 establishments in Malaysia